Bruno Bethlem de Amorim (born 22 October 1975 in Rio de Janeiro), also known as "Bebum", is a Brazilian sailor gold medallist in the Pan American Games, the South American Games, and the Snipe World Championships.

He started sailing Optimist at the age of eleven, moving to Europe, 470 and Snipe later on his career. His biggest accomplishments have come in the Snipe class, where he has won the Brazilian National Championship 9 times (2003, 2005, 2006, 2007, 2008, 2009, 2010, 2012 and 2013), twice the South American Championship (2000 and 2018), the Pan American Games (2003) and the South American Games (2006), and twice the World Championships (2009 and 2013), where he also won the bronze medal in 2011.

Pan American Games
 1st place in Snipe at Santo Domingo 2003.

South American Games
 1st place in Snipe at Buenos Aires 2006.

World Championships
 1st place in Snipe at San Diego 2009.
 1st place in Snipe at Rio de Janeiro 2013.

Olympic Games 
He and Henrique Haddad placed 23rd in the men's 470 event at the 2016 Summer Olympics. He competed at the 2020 Summer Olympics.

References

External links
 
 
 
 

1975 births
Living people
Brazilian male sailors (sport)
Olympic sailors of Brazil
Pan American Games gold medalists for Brazil
Sailors at the 2003 Pan American Games
Sailors at the 2016 Summer Olympics – 470
Snipe class world champions
Pan American Games medalists in sailing
World champions in sailing for Brazil
South American Games gold medalists for Brazil
South American Games medalists in sailing
Competitors at the 2006 South American Games
Medalists at the 2003 Pan American Games
Sailors at the 2020 Summer Olympics – 470
Sportspeople from Rio de Janeiro (city)